Do Animals Believe in God? is the sole studio album by English post-punk band Pink Military, released in 1980 by record label Eric's. "Did You See Her?" was re-recorded for the album. Another version had previously been released as a single. The sleeve was designed by Bob Wakelin of Modern Eon.

Reception 

Trouser Press called the album "an eclectically derivative (yet amusing) hodgepodge that is neither stunningly original nor disgustingly clichéd".

Do Animals Believe in God? was mentioned in NME's list of the best albums of 1980.

Track listing
All tracks written and arranged by Pink Military
"Degenerated Man"
"I Cry"
"Did You See Her?"
"Wild West"
"Back on the London Stage"
"After Hiroshima"
"Living in a Jungle"
"Dreamtime"
"War Games"
"Heaven/Hell"
"Do Animals Believe in God?"

Personnel
Jayne Casey - vocals
Nicky "Cool" Hillon - synthesizer, guitar
Charlie "Gruff" Griffiths - synthesizer, Yamaha grand piano
Chris Joyce - drums
Neil Innes - congas, percussion
with:
Martin Dempsey - bass on "War Games"
John Brierley - engineer
Bob Wakelin - sleeve design

References

External links 

 

1980 debut albums
Pink Military albums